Makokoba is a constituency of the National Assembly of the Parliament of Zimbabwe located in the township of the same name in Bulawayo, Zimbabwe. Its current MP since 2018 is James Sithole of the Movement for Democratic Change Alliance.

Members

Election results

References

Parliamentary constituencies in Zimbabwe